South Carolina Highway 154 (SC 154) is a  state highway in the U.S. state of South Carolina. The highway connects Mayesville and Bishopville.

Route description
SC 154 begins at an intersection with U.S. Route 76 (US 76; Florence Highway) in Mayesville, within Sumter County, where the roadway continues as Mayes Open Road. It travels to the north-northwest and enters Lee County. In St. Charles, it intersects US 401 (Darlington Highway). The highway passes Lower Lee Elementary School and goes through rural areas of the county. It passes over, but does not have an interchange with Interstate 20. A short distance later, it enters Bishopville, where it meets its northern terminus, an intersection with US 15 (Sumter Highway).

Major intersections

See also

References

External links

SC 154 at Virginia Highways' South Carolina Highways Annex

154
Transportation in Sumter County, South Carolina
Transportation in Lee County, South Carolina